John Raymond Kniveton was a Member of the Legislative Council of the Isle of Man.

Born in 1933, he was educated at Douglas High School.  He joined NatWest Bank and the Royal Air Force before becoming the Managing Director of Tours (Isle of Man) and a director of Laxey Glen Mills.  He was a member of Onchan Commissioners between 1989 and 1995 and was elected to the House of Keys in 1994.  In 1998 he was elevated to the Legislative Council.

References

Members of the House of Keys 1991–1996
Members of the Legislative Council of the Isle of Man
1933 births
Living people